The 2015 World RX of Great Britain was the 4th round of the second season of the FIA World Rallycross Championship. The event was held at the Lydden Hill Race Circuit in Wootton, Kent.

Heats

Semi-finals

Semi-final 1

Semi-final 2

Final

Championship standings after the event

References

External links

|- style="text-align:center"
|width="35%"|Previous race:2015 World RX of Belgium
|width="30%"|FIA World Rallycross Championship2015 season
|width="35%"|Next race:2015 World RX of Germany
|- style="text-align:center"
|width="35%"|Previous race:2014 World RX of Great Britain
|width="30%"|World RX of Great Britain
|width="35%"|Next race:2016 World RX of Great Britain
|- style="text-align:center"

Great Britain
World RX
World RX